The 2005 Nebraska Cornhuskers football team represented the University of Nebraska–Lincoln in the 2005 NCAA Division I-A football season. The team was coached by Bill Callahan and played their home games in Memorial Stadium in Lincoln, Nebraska.

Before the season
Nebraska experienced many changes to their team's roster; not only did key wide receiver Ross Pilkington leave the team after he gave up football, but after the spring game, new junior college transfer Zac Taylor replaced the 2004 starter Joe Dailey at the key position of quarterback. Shortly thereafter Joe Dailey transferred to North Carolina.

Schedule

Roster and coaching staff

Depth chart

Game summaries

Maine

Speculation that the 2005 season could perhaps be worse than the 2004 season began when Nebraska struggled to defeat the severe underdog Maine team 25–7.

Wake Forest

The team went on to crush the Wake Forest Demon Deacons (Zac Taylor's former four year college) 31–3.  The win was unusual in that Nebraska's defense scored more points than either team's offense (Nebraska's defense scored 18 points, their offense 6, their special teams 7).

Pittsburgh

Their next game is arguably one of the most climactic in the history of all of football.  The score was Nebraska 7 and the Pittsburgh Panthers 6.  With 7 seconds remaining, the Panthers were going to attempt a game-winning field goal from 36 yards.  The ball was snapped with the holder unprepared for the play.  The ball rebounded off the holder's helmet.  Pittsburgh's kicker recovered the ball and threw it incomplete to preserve time.  One second remained on the clock as Pittsburgh prepared for the final play.  Pittsburgh attempted the kick again, the holder prepared this time.  Pittsburgh's kicker looked as though he would have made the field goal had it not been blocked by Nebraska's Adam Ickes.

Iowa State

Nebraska's next game was equally exciting as unranked and undefeated Nebraska took on the #23 Iowa State Cyclones.  They won in a hard fought match that went into 2 overtimes by a score of 27–20.  The game marked the first time that overtime had occurred in Memorial Stadium.  Regardless of the quality win, Nebraska remained unranked.

Texas Tech

Nebraska was the only team that was unranked and had no losses going into their next game against the 15th ranked Texas Tech Red Raiders.  After trailing 21–0 in the first half, Nebraska fought back and eventually gained a 31–27 foothold over Texas Tech.  In the final minutes of the game, Nebraska seemingly sealed their victory and a top 25 ranking when lineman LeKevin Smith intercepted a Texas Tech pass only to fumble it seconds later to return possession to Texas Tech.  The Red Raiders were given a second-chance and with time winding down threw the game-winning touchdown pass to defeat Nebraska.

Baylor

Missouri

Oklahoma

Kansas

The Huskers lost 3 of their next 4 games, including losses to their rival Missouri Tigers, who defeated them 41–24, a crushing 40-15 defeat to the Kansas Jayhawks (which snapped a 36-year winning streak over Kansas), and rival Oklahoma Sooners, the latter being lost in the final minutes of the game. (This victory was vacated by an NCAA disciplinary panel in July 2007 and then conversely overruled in February 2008.) The only win in this slump was a victory over a sub-par Baylor team.

Kansas State

In a particularly windy game against Kansas State, Nebraska trailed 25–24 with 4:18 remaining in the game. Zac Taylor was on the receiving end of a hard hit that landed him with a mild concussion, removing him from the game.  Zac remained on the ground for a couple of minutes with Callahan and KSU's Bill Snyder towering over him.  The sold out crowd began to chant his name, as Taylor tried to recompose himself.  Backup quarterback, freshman Harrison Beck, burned his redshirt in order to record his first action in a college football game.  After throwing an interception in his first drive, he threw a key reception in Nebraska's final drive.  Freshman kicker Jordan Congdon came in to make the go-ahead field goal.  This was a risky move as the wind was swirling and was so strong that it ripped the stadium's mammoth U.S. flag off a crane that was suspending it, seemingly as a testament to its power.  Regardless, Congdon made the 40-yard field goal to give Nebraska the win.

Colorado

Nebraska's final regular season game of 2005 was at Colorado.  Colorado, who was leading the Big 12 North division in the race to the Big 12 championship game, was the heavy favorite, as Nebraska was cold after 3 straight losses followed by a near miss against a struggling Kansas State team.  Tension built up between the rivals as a verbal skirmish involving every player erupted in the center of the field between the two teams when Nebraska mistook Colorado players walking toward their half of the field as an insult.  Colorado was stunned, however, when Nebraska dominated Colorado in every aspect of the game.  Wearing motivational T-shirts reading "RESTORE THE ORDER" underneath their jerseys, Nebraska beat Colorado 30–3 with breakout performances from nearly every player, particularly Zac Taylor and Colorado native Cory Ross.

Alamo Bowl vs Michigan

The team finished with 7 wins and 4 losses in the regular season.  Nebraska would play their bowl game against the Michigan Wolverines in the 2005 Alamo Bowl in San Antonio, Texas.  With 2 seconds left in the game the Wolverines trailed the Cornhuskers 32-28 and set up the hook & lateral play for a miracle touchdown.  In one of the wildest finishes ever, Michigan lateraled the football 9 times, fumbling once on their way to a 59-yard gain.  In the midst of all this the entire Nebraska sideline stormed the field in celebration thinking the game was over when Michigan fumbled the ball (from their point of view they could not see that the ball was loose and assumed the Michigan player to be down).  Many players thinking the play was over stopped playing entirely.  This allowed the Michigan ball carrier to run by them, In all the confusion some Michigan players did not block for their carrier.  Before the play was over the Cornhuskers, several Michigan players and coaches, and several other individuals along with the awards podium were on the field, and the game officials had left to submit their votes for the award winners.  The Michigan ball carrier had been pushed out of bounds inside of the red zone.  No penalties were awarded to either team because the officials had already left.  When all was said and done, Nebraska came off with a victory and ended their season with an 8–4 record.

Rankings

After the season
Bill Callahan's second season as coach concluded with his Huskers finishing the season with an 8–4 record, an improvement over the 5–6 record of 2004.

Awards

NFL and pro players
The following Nebraska players who participated in the 2005 season later moved on to the next level and joined a professional or semi-pro team as draftees or free agents.

References

Nebraska
Nebraska Cornhuskers football seasons
Alamo Bowl champion seasons
Nebraska Cornhuskers football